This is a list of members of the Australian Capital Territory Legislative Assembly from 1995 to 1998. This was the first time the three-electorate, Hare-Clark system was used to elect members of the Assembly.

 ALP member Terry Connolly resigned from the Assembly on 19 February 1996. The vacancy was filled by the ALP's Marion Reilly.
 ALP member Rosemary Follett resigned from the Assembly on 12 December 1996. The vacancy was filled by the ALP's Simon Corbell.
 Liberal member Tony De Domenico resigned from the Assembly on 30 January 1997. The vacancy was filled by Liberal Louise Littlewood.

See also
1995 Australian Capital Territory general election

Members of Australian Capital Territory parliaments by term
20th-century Australian politicians